

Denmark
St. Thomas & St. John –
Christian von Schweder, Governor of St. Thomas & St. John (1744–1747)
Christian Suhm, Governor of St. Thomas & St. John (1747–1758)
St. Croix –
Friderich Moth, Governor of St. Croix (1735–1747)
Jens Hansen, Governor of St. Croix (1747–1751)

France
New France –
Le marquis de Beauharnois, Governor-General of New France (1726–1747)
Le comte de La Galissonnère, Governor-General of New France (1747–1749)

Portugal
 Angola – Joaquim Jacques de Magalhães, Governor of Angola (1738–1748)
 Macau –
 Antonio de Mendonca Corte-Real, Governor of Macau (1743–1747)
 Jose Placido de Matos Saraiva, Governor of Macau (1747–1749)

United Kingdom
 Bermuda –
 Francis Jones, Governor of Bermuda (1744–1747)
 William Popple, Governor of Bermuda (July 1747 – December 1763)
 Gibraltar – William Hargrave, Governor of Gibraltar (1740–1749)
 Jamaica – Edward Trelawney, Governor of Jamaica (1738–1752)
 Colony of Newfoundland – post vacant
 Province of New Hampshire – Benning Wentworth, Royal Governor of New Hampshire (1741–1766)
 Province of New York – George Clinton, Governor of New York (1743–1753)
 Nova Scotia – Richard Philipps, Governor of Nova Scotia (1717–1749)
 Colony of Virginia – Willem van Keppel, 2nd Earl of Albemarle, Crown Governor of Virginia (1737–1754)

Colonial governors
Colonial governors
1747